Mikyla Dodd (born 1978, in Blackburn) is an English actress who is most famous for playing the role of Chloe Bruce in the Channel 4 soap opera Hollyoaks from 2000 until 2004.

In 2006, she appeared in the ITV Reality TV show Celebrity Fit Club.

In 2008, Dodd guest starred in an episode of Casualty for the BBC.

Memoir
On 28 June 2007, Dodd's memoir The Fat Girl from Hollyoaks, a record of her weight problems as a teenager and life as an actress in a British television soap opera, was published by Hodder & Stoughton. For its paperback release, its title will reportedly be 
Playing the Fat Girl. Mikyla went to Billinge High School

References

External links 

Interview with Mikyla Dodd on the Metro website 

1978 births
English soap opera actresses
English television actresses
Living people
People from Blackburn